Mill Green is a hamlet near the village of Buxhall, in the English county of Suffolk.

See also 
 Buxhall Windmill

References 

Philip's Street Atlas Suffolk (page 65)

External links 

Hamlets in Suffolk
Mid Suffolk District